Phil Evans (born 12 July 1980 in Cardiff, Wales) is a retired South African association football defender and defensive midfielder. Evans last played for Thanda Royal Zulu.

International goals

Honours

Individual
 CONCACAF Gold Cup Best XI (Honorable Mention): 2005

External links

1980 births
Living people
British emigrants to South Africa
Association football fullbacks
Association football midfielders
Association football utility players
Naturalised citizens of South Africa
Footballers from Cardiff
South Africa international soccer players
South African soccer players
South African people of Welsh descent
SuperSport United F.C. players
Bidvest Wits F.C. players
Welsh expatriates in South Africa
Thanda Royal Zulu F.C. players
2005 CONCACAF Gold Cup players